Kaneung Buransook (born March 3, 1986) is a Thai retired professional footballer who played as an attacking midfielder.

Club career

Honours

Club
Ratchaburi
 Thai Division 1 League: 2012

External links
 Profile at Goal
 

1986 births
Living people
Kaneung Buransook
Kaneung Buransook
Association football forwards
Kaneung Buransook
Kaneung Buransook
Kaneung Buransook
Kaneung Buransook
Kaneung Buransook
Kaneung Buransook
Kaneung Buransook
Kaneung Buransook
Kaneung Buransook
Kaneung Buransook
Kaneung Buransook
Kaneung Buransook
Kaneung Buransook